The 2015 Chinese Artistic Gymnastics Championships were held from 1-4 June 2015 in Fuzhou, Fujian.

Medalists

Women's results

Team

All-around

Vault

Uneven bars

Balance beam

Floor exercise

References 

Chinese Artistic Gymnastics Championships
2015 in Chinese sport
Chinese Artistic Gymnastics Championships